Arbade Bironze is a professional footballer from Uganda. He currently plays for Nakhon Pathom in the Thailand Premier League.

References
 Official team website

Living people
Ugandan footballers
Ugandan expatriate sportspeople in Malaysia
Expatriate footballers in Malaysia
1979 births
Arbade Bironze
Ugandan expatriate sportspeople in Thailand
Expatriate footballers in Thailand
Association football defenders
Sportspeople from Kampala